State Highway 69 (SH 69) is a State Highway in Kerala, India that starts in Thrissur and ends in Thrikkanapuram near Kuttippuram ( joins  National Highway 66). The highway is 52.65 km long.

The Route Map 
Thrissur – Choondal – Kunnamkulam – Perumpilavu – Changaramkulam– Edappal – Thrikkanapuram (joins NH 66)

See also 
Roads in Kerala
List of State Highways in Kerala

References 

State Highways in Kerala
Roads in Thrissur district
Roads in Malappuram district